L12 may refer to:

Ships and boats 
 , a submarine of the Royal Navy
 , a destroyer of the Royal Navy
 , a helicopter carrier of the Royal Navy
 , a sloop of the Royal Navy
 , a Leninets-class submarine

Other uses 
 Lectionary 12, a 12th-century, Greek manuscript of the New Testament 
 Liberty L-12, an American aircraft engine
 Lockheed L-12 Electra Junior, an American passenger aircraft
 LSWR L12 class, a class of steam locomotives
 TEDOM L 12, a Czech bus
 L-12, an L-class blimp of the United States Navy